Sergio Clerici (born 25 May 1941 in São Paulo) is a retired Brazilian footballer who played as a forward in Italy for Lecco, Bologna, Atalanta, Verona, Fiorentina, Napoli and Lazio.

In 1978, he played in the National Soccer League with Montreal Castors.

References

External links
Sergio Clerici at www.pianetaazzurro.it 

1941 births
Living people
Footballers from São Paulo
Brazilian footballers
Brazilian football managers
Brazilian expatriate footballers
Serie A players
Serie B players
Association football forwards
Expatriate footballers in Italy
Campeonato Brasileiro Série A managers
Calcio Lecco 1912 players
Bologna F.C. 1909 players
Atalanta B.C. players
Hellas Verona F.C. players
ACF Fiorentina players
S.S.C. Napoli players
S.S. Lazio players
Montreal Castors players
Canadian National Soccer League players
Sociedade Esportiva Palmeiras managers
Santos FC managers
Associação Atlética Internacional (Limeira) managers